Mongolian People's Revolutionary Party may refer to:
 Mongolian People's Party, which reverted to its original pre-1924 name ("Mongolian People's Party", without the word "Revolutionary") in 2010
 Mongolian People's Revolutionary Party (2010), whose members split from the original party after the name change